Dmitry Aleksandrovich Belorukov (born 24 March 1983) is a Russian football coach and a former player who played as a centre-back. He is the manager of FC Dynamo Saint Petersburg.

Career statistics

Club

Notes

External links
Profile on Official FC Amkar Website

1983 births
Footballers from Saint Petersburg
Living people
Russian footballers
Russia under-21 international footballers
Association football defenders
FC Anzhi Makhachkala players
FC Amkar Perm players
FC Dynamo Moscow players
FC Zenit-2 Saint Petersburg players
FC Petrotrest players
Russian Premier League players
Russian First League players
Russian Second League players
Russian football managers
FC Dynamo Saint Petersburg managers